The Embassy of Turkey in Santiago is the diplomatic mission of Turkey to Chile. The incumbent ambassador is Gülcan Akoğuz. The embassy also hosts offices of representatives and attachés from Ministry of the Interior, Ministry of Trade and Turkish Armed Forces.

History 
The relations between Turkey and Chile goes back to the opening of the Turkish Embassy in Santiago in 2 August 1930. The inaugural envoy was Chargé d'Affaires Talat Kayaalp.

References 

Diplomatic missions in Santiago
Diplomatic missions of Turkey
Chile–Turkey relations